Sipirok is a town in North Sumatra province of Indonesia and the seat (capital) of South Tapanuli Regency. It is known for the Batu Jomba Sipirok, a badly maintained highway which becomes difficult and dangerous during wet weather.

Notable residents
Hasjrul Harahap, Minister of Forestry (1993-1998)
 Mangaradja Soeangkoepon, (1885-1946) Volksraad member
 Abdul Rasjid, native physician and Volksraad member
 , Indonesian actor and comedian

References

Regency seats of North Sumatra
Populated places in North Sumatra